Battlefield Britain is a 2004 BBC television documentary series about famous battles in British history. The 8 part series covers battles from Boudicca's rebellion against the Romans in 60AD to the Battle of Britain in 1940 it also covers the impact and implications the battles had on the future of the British isles.

The series is presented by father and son team Peter and Dan Snow. Peter explains the battle plans, topography of the battleground and the actions of the generals while Dan visits the sites to give the real-life perspective of the servicemen on the ground.

The episodes also feature re-enactments of key phases of the battles, a computer-generated bird's-eye view of the battleground to show the topography and troop movements.

Production
Dan Snow said there was never any plan for his father and him to work together. it happened after someone at the BBC saw Dan's video diary of the Oxford and Cambridge boat race in 2000. 
Peter Snow was then offered the chance to do a history series with his son, an idea he initially rejected. Dan talked him round and they filmed a pilot episode. Dan has stated that he didn't find the work easy.

Media information
A companion radio show Battlefield Ramblings was broadcast weekly on BBC Radio 4 to accompany the series. Each week a guest would join the presenter Muriel Gray for a walk in areas linked to the people and events featured in the TV show. The first episode was broadcast from Boudicca's Way in Norfolk with guests Dan and Peter Snow who argued constantly during the programme.

In Australia, all eight episodes aired on SBS TV in its As It Happened history timeslot each Saturday at 7:30pm from 22 January until 12 March 2005.

Companion book

DVD release
 Battlefield Britain: The Complete Series (3-disc box-set), Region 1 (NTSC) and Region 2 (PAL), BBC Worldwide, 23 October 2006

Online game
A popular online game Battlefield Academy was created by Solaris Media (now Playniac) to accompany the series. The game features four historical scenarios based on episodes from the series and was produced with Dan Snow, Matthew Bennett from Sandhurst and the BBC History team.

Episode listing

Reception
The series won Best Visual Effects at the BAFTA craft awards in 2004. And a Welsh BAFTA award for Best Sound in 2005.

See also
 20th Century Battlefields

External links
 
 Dan Snow on Culloden

References

Battle of Britain
British military television series
Documentary television series about aviation
Documentary television series about war
English-language television shows
Glyndŵr Rising
Jacobite rising of 1745
2004 British television series debuts
2004 British television series endings
Television series about the history of the United Kingdom
BBC television documentaries about prehistoric and ancient history
BBC television documentaries about medieval history
BBC television documentaries about history during the 20th Century